A derby is a type of horse race named after the Derby Stakes run at Epsom Downs Racecourse in England. That was in turn named after Edward Smith-Stanley, 12th Earl of Derby, who inaugurated the race in 1780. Perhaps the best-known example after the original is the Kentucky Derby in the United States.

Traditionally, the term "derby" is used strictly to refer to races restricted to three-year-olds, as the English and U.S. Triple Crown races all are. The most notable exceptions to this rule are the Hong Kong Derby and Singapore Derby, restricted to four-year-old Thoroughbreds, and the Canadian Pacing Derby, an annual harness race for "aged pacers" (Standardbreds) four years old and up.

In Scandinavian harness racing Derby is restricted to four-year-olds. Exception is the Finnhorse Derby, which is restricted to five-year-olds.

Other
American Classic Races
British Classic Races
French Classic Races
Thoroughbred horse racing
Triple Crown of Thoroughbred Racing

Notes

References

Horse races in Great Britain
High society (social class)